Acianthera hygrophila is a species of orchid plant native to Brazil.

References 

hygrophila
Flora of Brazil
Plants described in 1882